This is the chronological discography of Brian Littrell.

Albums

Singles

Other songs

References

Discographies of American artists